

A–S 

To find entries for A–S, use the table of contents above.

T 

 T.A.Chr. – Tyge Ahrengot Christensen (1918–1996)
 Täckh. – Vivi Täckholm (1898–1978)
 Tagg – Harry Frank Tagg (1874–1933)
 Takeda – Hisayoshi Takeda (1883–1972)
 Takeuchi – H.Takeuchi (fl. 1929)
 Takht. – Armen Takhtajan (1910–2009)
 Tali – Kadri Tali (born 1966)
 Taliev – Valerij Ivanovich Taliev (1872–1932) 
 Tamamsch. – Sophia G. Tamamschjan (1901–1981)
 T.Amano – Tetsuo Amano (born 1912)
 Tamayo – Francisco Tamayo (1902–1985)
 Tamiya – Hiroshi Tamiya (1903–1984)
 Tammes – Tine (Jantine) Tammes (1871–1947)
 Tamura – Michio Tamura (1927–2007)
 Tanaka – Chōzaburō Tanaka (1885–1976)
 Tandang – Danilo N. Tandang 
 T.Anderson – Thomas Anderson (1832–1870)
 Tang – Tsin Tang (1897–1984)
 Tangav. – A. C. Tangavelou (fl. 2003)
 Tansley – Arthur Tansley (1871–1955)
 Tao Chen – Tao Chen (born 1963)
 Tärnström – Christopher Tärnström (1703–1746)
 Tartenova – M. A. Tartenova (fl. 1957)
 T.A.Stephenson – Thomas Alan Stephenson (1898–1961)
 Tat. – Alexander Alexejevitch Tatarinow (1817–1886)
 Tate – Ralph Tate (1840–1901)
 Tateoka – Tsuguo Tateoka (1931–1994)
 Tatew. – Misao Tatewaki (1899–1976)
 Taton – Auguste Taton (1914–1989)
 Taub. – Paul Hermann Wilhelm Taubert (1862–1897)
 Tausch – Ignaz Friedrich Tausch (1793–1848)
 Tawan – Cheksum Supiah Tawan (born 1959)
 T.A.Williams – Thomas Albert Williams (1865–1900)
 Taylor – Thomas Taylor (1786–1848)
 T.Baskerv. – Thomas Baskerville (1812–1840)
 T.Bastard – Thomas Bastard (died 1815)
 T.Baytop. – Turhan Baytop (1920–2002)
 T.B.Lee – Tchang Bok Lee (died 2003)
 T.B.Moore – Thomas Bather Moore (1850–1919)
 T.Cao – Tong Cao (born 1946)
 T.C.Chen – Tê Chao Chen (born 1926)
 T.C.E.Fr. – Thore Christian Elias Fries (1886–1930)
 T.Chen – T. Chen (fl. 1985)
 T.C.Hsu – Tian Chuan Hsu (fl. 2006)
 T.C.Huang – Tseng Chieng Huang (born 1931)
 T.Cooke – Theodore Cooke (1836–1910)
 T.C.Palmer – Thomas Chalkley Palmer (1860–1935)
 T.C.Pan – Ti Chang Pan (born 1937)
 T.C.Scheff. – Theodore Comstock Scheffer (born 1904)
  T.C.Wilson – Trevor C. Wilson (fl. 2012)
 T.D.Jacobsen – Terry Dale Jacobsen (born 1950)
 T.D.Macfarl. – Terry Desmond Macfarlane (born 1953)
 T.D.Penn. – Terence Dale Pennington (born 1938)
 T.Duncan – Thomas Duncan (born 1948)
 T.Durand – Théophile Alexis Durand (1855–1912)
 T.E.Hunt –  (1913–1970)
 Teijsm. – Johannes Elias Teijsmann (1808–1882)
 Temb. – Yakov Gustavovich Temberg (born 1914)
 Temminck – Coenraad Jacob Temminck (1778–1858)
 Temp. – Joannes Albert Tempère (1847–1926)
 Templeton – John Templeton (1766–1825)
 Temu – Ruwa-Aichi Pius Cosmos Temu (born 1955)
 Ten. – Michele Tenore (1780–1861)
 Ten.-Woods – Julian Edmund Tenison-Woods (1832–1889)
 Teo – Stephen P. Teo (fl. 1997)
 Teodor. – Emanoil Constantin Teodoresco (1866–1949)
 Tepper – Johann Gottlieb Otto Tepper (1841–1923)
 Teppner — Herwig Teppner (born 1941)
 T.E.Raven – Tamra Engelhorn Raven (born 1945)
 T.F.Andrews – Theodore Francis Andrews (born 1917)
 T.F.Daniel – Thomas Franklin Daniel (born 1954)
 T.F.Forst. – Thomas Furley Forster (1761–1825)
 T.G.Gao – Tian Gang Gao
 T.G.Hartley – Thomas Gordon Hartley (born 1931)
 T.G.J.Rayner – Timothy Guy Johnson Rayner (born 1963)
 T.G.Pearson – Thomas Gilbert Pearson (1873–1943)
 T.Green – Ted Green (born 1921)
 T.G.White – Theodore Greely White (1872–1901)
 T.Hall. – Tony Hall (fl. 2011)
 T.Hanb. – Thomas Hanbury (1832–1907)
 Tharp – Benjamin Carroll Tharp (1885–1964)
 T.H.Chung – Tai Hyun Chung (1882–1971)
 Theilade – Ida Theilade (fl. 1995)
 Thell. – Albert Thellung (1881–1928)
 Theophr. – Theophrastus (Tyrtamus) (c. 371 – c. 287 BC)
 Thér. – Irénée Thériot (1859–1947)
 Therese – Princess Theresa of Bavaria (1850–1925)
 Th.Fr. – Theodor Magnus Fries (1832–1913)
 Thiede – Joachim Thiede (born 1963)
 Thiele – Friedrich Leopold Thiele (died 1841)
 Thieret – John William Thieret (born 1926)
 Thines – Marco Thines (born 1978)
 Thomé – Otto Wilhelm Thomé (1840–1925)
 Thomson – Thomas Thomson (1817–1878)
 T.Hong – Tao Hong (fl. 1963)
 Thonn. – Peter Thonning (1775–1848)
 Thonner – Franz Thonner (1863–1928)
 Thorel – Clovis Thorel (1833–1911)
 Thorne – Robert Folger Thorne (born 1920)
 Thoroddsen – Þorvaldur (Thorvaldur) Thoroddsen (1855–1921)
 Thorsen – Mike Thorsen (fl. 2009)
 Thory – Claude Antoine Thory (1759–1827)
 Thoth. – Krishnamurthy Thothathri (born 1929)
 Thouars – Louis-Marie Aubert du Petit-Thouars (1758–1831)
 Thouin – André Thouin (1747–1824)
 Threlfall – S. Threlfall (fl. 1983)
 Threlkeld – Caleb Threlkeld (1676–1728)
 Thuill. – Jean Louis Thuillier (1757–1822)
 Thulin – Mats Thulin (born 1948)
 Thüm. – Felix von Thümen (1839–1892)
 Thunb. – Carl Peter Thunberg (1743–1828)
 Thur. – Gustave Adolphe Thuret (1817–1875)
 Thurb. – George Thurber (1821–1890)
 Thurm. – Jules Thurmann (1804–1855)
 Thurn – Everard Ferdinand im Thurn (1852–1932)
 Thwaites – George Henry Kendrick Thwaites (1811–1882)
 Th.Wolf – Theodor Wolf (1841–1924)
 Tich – Nguyen Thien Tich (fl. 2010)
 Tidestr. – Ivar Tidestrom (1864–1956)
 Tiegh. – Philippe Édouard Léon van Tieghem (1839–1914)
 Tilesius – Wilhelm Gottlieb Tilesius von Tilenau (1769–1857)
 Tiling – Heinrich Sylvester Theodor Tiling (1818–1871)
 Timb.-Lagr. – Édouard Timbal-Lagrave (1819–1888)
 Timeroy – Marc Antoine Timeroy (1793–1856)
 Timler – Friedrich Karl Timler (born 1914)
 Tindale – Mary Douglas Tindale (1920–2011)
 Tineo – Vincenzo Tineo (1791–1856)
 Titius – Johann Daniel Titius (Tietz) (1729–1796)
 T.Itô – Tokutarô Itô (1868–1941)
 Tjaden – William Louis Tjaden (born 1913)
 T.J.Ayers – Tina J. Ayers (born 1957)
 T.J.Chester – Thomas Jay Chester (born 1951)
 T.Jensen – Thomas Jensen (1824–1877)
 T.J.Motley – Timothy J. Motley (1966–2013)
 T.J.Sørensen – Thorvald (Thorwald) Julius Sørensen (1902–1973)
 T.J.Wallace – Thomas Jennings Wallace (born 1912)
 T.J.Zhang – Tie Jun Zhang (born 1962)
 T.Knight – Thomas Andrew Knight (1759–1838)
 T.Kop. – Timo Juhani Koponen (born 1939)
T.Lebel – Teresa Lebel
 T.Lestib. – Thémistocle Gaspard Lestiboudois (1797–1876)
 T.L.Ming – Tien Lu Ming (born 1937)
 T.Lobb – Thomas Lobb (1820–1894)
 T.MacDoug. – Thomas Baillie MacDougall (1895–1973)
 T.Marsson – Theodor Friedrich Marsson (1816–1892)
 T.M.Barkley – Theodore Mitchell Barkley (1934–2004)
 T.M.Harris – Thomas Maxwell Harris (1903–1983)
 T.Miyake – Tsutomu Miyake (born 1880)
 T.Moore – Thomas Moore (1821–1887)
 T.M.Reeve – Thomas M. Reeve (fl. 1989)
 T.M.Salter – Terence Macleane Salter (1883–1969)
 T.M.Schust. – Tanja M. Schuster (fl. 2011)
 T.Nees – Theodor Friedrich Ludwig Nees von Esenbeck (1787–1837)
 T.N.McCoy – Thomas Nevil McCoy (born 1905)
 T.N.Nguyen – Thi Nhan Nguyen (born 1953)
 Tod. – Agostino Todaro (1818–1892)
 Todzia – Carol Ann Todzia (fl. 1986)
 Toelken – Hellmut Richard Toelken (born 1939)
 Toledo – Joaquim Franco de Toledo (1905–1952)
 Tolm. – Alexandr Innokentevich Tolmatchew (1903–1979)
 Tomas. – Ruggero Tomaselli (1920–1982)
 Tomm. – Muzio Giuseppe Spirito de Tommasini (1794–1879)
 Torén – Olof Torén (1718–1753)
 Torr. – John Torrey (1796–1873)
 Torre – Antonio Rocha da Torre (1904–1995)
 Torrend – Camille Torrend (1875–1961)
 T.Osborn – Theodore George Bentley Osborn (1887–1973)
 Totten – Henry Roland Totten (1892–1974)
 Tourlet – Ernest Henry Tourlet (1843–1907)
 Tourn. – Joseph Pitton de Tournefort (1656–1708)
 Touton – Karl Touton (1858–1934)
 Tovey – James Richard Tovey (1873–1922)
 T.P.Boyle – T. P. Boyle (fl. 2002)
 T.P.Lin – Tsan Piao Lin (born 1948)
 T.Post – Tom (Tomas) Erik von Post (1858–1912)
 T.Q.Nguyen – To Quyen Nguyen (fl. 1965)
 Trab. – Louis Charles Trabut (1853–1929)
 Tracey – John Geoffrey Tracey (1930–2004) 
 Tracy – Samuel Mills Tracy (1847–1920)
 Trad. – John Tradescant the younger (1608–1662)
 Trail – James William Helenus Trail (1851–1919)
 Transeau – Edgar Nelson Transeau (1875–1960) 
 Tratt. – Leopold Trattinnick (1764–1889)
 Traub – Hamilton Paul Traub (1890–1983)
 Trautv. – Ernst Rudolf von Trautvetter (1809–1889)
 T.R.Dudley – Theodore Robert Dudley (1936–1944)
 Treat – Mary Lua Adelia Davis Treat (1830–1923)
 Trécul – Auguste Trécul (1818–1896)
 T.Reeves – Timothy Reeves (born 1947)
 Trel. – William Trelease (1857–1945)
 Treub – Melchior Treub (1851–1910)
 Trevelyan – Walter Calverley Trevelyan (1797–1879)
 Trevir. – Ludolf Christian Treviranus (1779–1864)
 Trevis. – Vittore Benedetto Antonio Trevisan de Saint-Léon (1818–1897)
 Trew – Christoph Jakob Trew (1695–1769)
 Triana – José Jerónimo Triana (1834–1890)
 Trimen – Henry Trimen (1843–1896)
 Trin. – Carl Bernhard von Trinius (1778–1844)
 Tripp – Frances E. Tripp (1832–1890) 
 Tristram – Henry Baker Tristram (1822–1906)
 Troll – Wilhelm Troll (1897–1978)
 Trotter – Alessandro Trotter (1874–1967)
 Troupin – Georges M.D.J. Troupin (born 1923)
 Trudell – Harry W. Trudell (1879–1964)
 Trudgen – Malcolm Eric Trudgen (born 1951)
 True – Rodney Howard True (1866–1940)
 Trumbull – James Hammond Trumbull (1821–1897)
 Tscherm.-Seys. – Erich von Tschermak-Seysenegg (1871–1962)
 Tscherm.-Woess – Elisabeth Tschermak-Woess (1917–2001)
 Tsiang – Ying Tsiang (1898–1982)
 T.S.Nayar – T.S. Nayar (fl. 1998)
 T.S.Palmer – Theodore Sherman Palmer (1860–1962)
 T.S.Patrick – Thomas Stewart Patrick (1944–2019)
 T.Spratt – Thomas Abel Brimage Spratt (1811–1888)
 T.Stephenson – Thomas Stephenson (1865–1948)
 Tsukaya – Hirokazu Tsukaya (born 1964)
 Tswett – Mikhail Tsvet (1872–1919)
 T.S.Ying – Tsun Shen Ying (born 1933)
 T.Taylor – Thomas Taylor (1820–1910)
 T.T.Chang – Tun Tschu Chang (1927–2006)
 T.T.McIntosh – Terry T. McIntosh (born 1948)
 T.T.Yu – Tse Tsun Yu (1908–1986)
 Tubergen – Cornelis Gerrit van Tubergen (1844–1919)
 Tuck. – Edward Tuckerman (1817–1886)
 Tuckey – James Hingston Tuckey (1776–1816)
 Tul. – Louis René Tulasne (1815–1885)
 Tullb. – Sven Axel Teodor Tullberg (1852–1886)
 Tunmann – Otto Tunmann (1867–1919)
 Tur – Nuncia María Tur (born 1940)
 Turcz. – Nicolai Stepanovitch Turczaninow (1796–1863)
 Turland – Nicholas J. Turland (born 1966)
 Turner – Dawson Turner (1775–1858)
 Turpin – Pierre Jean François Turpin (1775–1840)
 Turra – Antonio Turra (1730–1796)
 Turrill – William Bertram Turrill (1890–1961)
 Tussac – François Richard de Tussac (1751–1837)
 Tutin – Thomas Gaskell Tutin (1908–1987)
 Tuyama – Takasi Tuyama (1910–2000)
 T.V.Egorova – Tatiana Vladimirovna Egorova (1930–2007)
 T.West – Tuffen West (1823–1891)
 Twining – Elizabeth Twining (1805–1889)
 T.W.Nelson – Thomas W. Nelson (1928–2006)
 T.Yamaz. – Takasi Yamazaki (1921–2007)
 T.Yukawa – Tomohisa Yukawa (fl. 1992)
 Tzanoud. – Dimitris Tzanoudakis (born 1950)
 Tzvelev – Nikolai Nikolaievich Tzvelev (1925–2015)

U 

 U.C.La – Ung Chil La (fl. 1966)
 Ucria – Bernardino da Ucria (1739–1796)
 Udachin – R. A. Udachin (fl. 1970)
 Udar – Ram Udar (1926–1985)
 Udovicic – Frank Udovicic (born 1966)
 Ueki – Robert Ueki (fl. 1973)
 U.Hamann – Ulrich Hamann (born 1931)
 Ulbr. – Oskar Eberhard Ulbrich (1879–1952)
 Ule – Ernst Heinrich Georg Ule (1854–1915)
 Uline – Edwin Burton Uline (1867–1933)
 Ulmer – Torsten Ulmer (born 1970)
 Umber – Ray E. Umber (fl. 1979)
 U.Müll.-Doblies – Ute Müller-Doblies (born 1938)
 Underw. – Lucien Marcus Underwood (1853–1907)
 Unger – Franz Joseph Andreas Nicolaus Unger (1800–1870)
 Unwin – William Charles Unwin (1811–1887)
 Upham – Warren Upham (1850–1934)
 U.P.Pratov – Uktam Pratovich Pratov (born 1934)
 Upton – Walter Thomas Upton (1922–2012)
 Urb. – Ignatz Urban (1848–1931)
 Urbatsch – Lowell Edward Urbatsch (born 1942)
 Ursch – Eugène Ursch (1882–1962)
 Urtubey – Estrella Urtubey (fl. 1999)
 U.Schneid. – Ulrike Schneider (born 1936)
 Usteri – Paul Usteri (1768–1831)
 Utsch – Jacob Utsch (1824–1901)
 Utteridge – Timothy Michael Arthur Utteridge (born 1970)

V 

 V.A.Albert – Victor Anthony Albert (born 1964)
 Vachell – Eleanor Vachell (1879–1948)
 V.A.Funk – Vicki Ann Funk (1947–2019) 
 Vaga – August Vaga (1893–1960)
 Vahl – Martin Vahl (1749–1804)
 Vail – Anna Murray Vail (1863–1955)
 Vaill. – Sébastien Vaillant (1669–1722)
 Vain. – Edvard (Edward) August Vainio (1853–1929)
 Val. – see Valeton
 Valck.Sur. – Jan Valckenier Suringar (1864–1932)
 Valentine – David Henriques Valentine (1912–1987)
 Valeton – Theodoric Valeton (1855–1929)
 Vallentin – Elinor Frances Vallentin (1873–1924)
 Vallès-Xirau – Joan Vallès-Xirau (born 1959)
 Valls – José Francisco Montenegro Valls (born 1945)
 V.A.Matthews – Victoria Ann Matthews (born 1941)
 Vand. – Domenico Agostino Vandelli (1735–1816)
 Vandas –  (1861–1923)
 Van der Byl – Paul Andries van der Bijl (1888–1939)
 van der Werff – Henk van der Werff (born 1946)
 Van Heurck – Henri Ferdinand Van Heurck (1838–1909)
 Vanhöffen – Ernst Vanhöffen (1858–1918)
 Van Houtte – Louis Benoit Van Houtte (1810–1876)
 Vanij. – Ongkarn Vanijajiva (born 1977)
 V.A.Nikitin – Vladimir Alekseevich Nikitin (1906–1974)
 Vaniot – Eugene Vaniot (1845–1913)
 van Jaarsv. – Ernst van Jaarsveld (born 1953)
 Van Scheepen – Johan Van Scheepen (fl. 1997)
 Varapr. – K.S. Varaprasad (fl. 2009)
 Vasey – George Vasey (1822–1893)
 Vassilcz. –  (1903–1995)
 Vasudeva – R.S. Vasudeva (fl. 1953)
 Vatke – Wilhelm Vatke (1849–1889)
 Vattimo – Ítalo de Vattimo (born 1930)
 Vaughan – John Vaughan (1855–1922)
 Vaupel – Friedrich Karl Johann Vaupel (1876–1927)
 Vauvel – Léopold Eugène Vauvel (1848–1915)
 Vavilov – Nikolai Vavilov (1887–1943)
 v.A.v.R. – Cornelis Rugier Willem Karel van Alderwerelt van Rosenburgh (1863–1936) (This has been replaced by the abbreviation Alderw. but still appears in older texts)
 V.A.W.Graham – Victoria Anne Wassell Graham (born 1950) (birth name Victoria Anne Wassell Smith)
 V.A.W.Sm. – Victoria Anne Wassell Smith (born 1950) (married name Victoria Anne Wassell Graham)
 V.B.Heinrich – Volker B. Heinrich (fl. 2009)
 V.Cordus – Valerius Cordus (1515–1544)
 V.C.Souza – Vinicius Castro Souza (born 1954)
 V.D.Matthews – Velma Dare Matthews (1904–1958)
 V.E.Avet. – Vandika Ervandovna Avetisyan (born 1928)
 V.E.Grant – Verne Edwin Grant (1917–2007)
 Veillon – Jean-Marie Veillon (fl. 1982)
 Veitch – John Gould Veitch (1839–1870)
 Veldk. – Jan Frederik Veldkamp (born 1941)
 Velen. – Josef Velenovský (1858–1949)
 Vell. – José Mariano da Conceição Vellozo (1742–1811)
 Velley – Thomas Velley (1749–1806)
 Velloso – Joaquim Velloso de Miranda (1733–1815)
 Vent. – Étienne Pierre Ventenat (1757–1808)
 Verdc. – Bernard Verdcourt (1925–2011)
 Verloove – Filip Verloove (fl. 2004)
 Verschaff. – Ambroise Colette Alexandre Verschaffelt (1825–1886)
 Vesque – Julien Joseph Vesque (1848–1895)
 Vest – Lorenz Chrysanth von Vest (1776–1840)
 Vězda – Antonín Vězda (1920–2008)
 V.Gibbs – Vicary Gibbs (1853–1932)
 V.Higgins – Vera Higgins (1892–1968)
 Vickery – Joyce Winifred Vickery (1908–1979)
 Vict. – Conrad Kirouac, Brother Marie-Victorin (1885–1944)
 Vida – Gábor Vida (born 1935)
 Vidal – António José Vidal (1808–1879)
 Vidal-Russ. – Romina Vidal-Russell
 Vieill. – Eugène Vieillard (1819–1896)
 Viera y Clavijo – José de Viera y Clavijo (1731–1813)
 Vierh. – Friedrich Karl Max Vierhapper (1876–1932)
 Vietz – Ferdinand Bernhard Vietz (1772–1815)
 Vig. – Louis Guillaume Alexandre Viguier (1790–1867)
 Vignolo – Ferdinando Vignolo-Lutati (1878–1965)
 Vilh. – Jan Vilhelm (1876–1931)
 Vill. – Dominique Villars (1745–1814)
 Villada – Manuel Maria Villada (1841–1924)
 Villar – Emile Huguet del Villar (1871–1951)
 Villarroel – Daniel Villarroel (born 1981)
 Villar-Seoane – Liliana Mónica Villar de Seoane (born 1953)
 Villaseñor – José Luis Villaseñor (born 1954)
 Vilm. – Pierre Louis François Lévêque de Vilmorin (1816–1860)
 Vink – Willem Vink (born 1931)
 Virot – Robert Virot (1915–2002)
 Vis. – Roberto de Visiani (1800–1878)
 Vitman – Fulgenzio Vitman (1728–1806)
 Vitt – Dale Hadley Vitt (born 1944)
 Vittad. – Carlo Vittadini (1800–1865)
 Viv. – Domenico Viviani (1772–1840)
 Viv.-Morel – Joseph Victor Viviand-Morel (1843–1915) 
 V.J.Chapm. – Valentine Jackson Chapman (1910–1980)
 Vlădescu – Mihai Vlădescu (1865–1944)
 Vl.V.Nikitin – Vladimir V. Nikitin (fl. 1996)
 V.M.Badillo – Victor Manuel Badillo (born 1920)
 V.M.Bates – Vernon M. Bates (fl. 1984)
 Vöcht. – Hermann Vöchting (1847–1917)
 Voeltzk. – Alfred Voeltzkow (1860–1947)
 Vogel – Julius Rudolph Theodor Vogel (1812–1841)
 Vogt – Robert M. Vogt (born 1957)
 Voigt – Joachim Otto Voigt (1798–1843)
 Volkart – Albert Volkart (1873–1951)
 Volkens – Georg Ludwig August Volkens (1855–1917) 
 Vollesen – Kaj Børge Vollesen (born 1946)
 Voronts. – Maria Sergeevna Vorontsova (born 1979) 
 Voss – Andreas Voss (1857–1924)
 V.P.Castro – Vitorino Paiva Castro (born 1942)
 V.P.Prasad – Vadhyaruparambil Prabhakaran Prasad (born 1960)
 V.Prakash – Ved Prakash (1957–2000)
 Vrugtman – Freek Vrugtman (1927–2022) 
 V.S.White – Violetta Susan Elizabeth White (1875–1949)
 V.Ten. – Vincenzo Tenore (1825–1886)
 Vugt – Rogier van Vugt (fl. 2009)
 Vuk. – Ljudevit Farkaš Vukotinović (1813–1893)
 Vural – Mecit Vural (fl. 1983)
 Vved. – Alexei Ivanovich Vvedensky (1898–1972)
 V.V.Nikitin – Vasilii Vasilevich Nikitin (1906–1988)

W–Z 

To find entries for W–Z, use the table of contents above.

 
1